Diego Antonio Hernández Aguayo (born 16 February 1998) is a Mexican professional footballer.

Honours
Necaxa
Copa MX: Clausura 2018

External links

Diego Hernandez at Sub-20 Profile

1998 births
Living people
Mexican footballers
Club Necaxa footballers
Tecos F.C. footballers
Liga MX players
Liga Premier de México players
Tercera División de México players
Footballers from Guadalajara, Jalisco
Association football central defenders